Det överexponerade gömstället (The Over Exposed Hideout) is the sixth studio album by Swedish indie rock band bob hund. It was released on 16 March 2011. The first single, "Popsång (mot min vilja)" was released on 21 February.

The cover of the album is design by bob hund's household artist Martin Kann, but is simply an email from Kann stating "Jag har ingen omslagsidé. Sorry, /Martin" (I have no idea for a cover. Sorry, /Martin).

Track listing
 bob hund 2020 2:53
 Tvångstankar (Obsessions) 5:43
 Popsång (mot min vilja) (Pop Song (Against My Will)) 3:14
 Stumfilm (Silent Movie) 7:30
 Det överexponerade gömstället (The Over Exposed Hideout) 5:16
 Lite av varje för ingen (A Little Bit of Everything for No One) 5:39
 Letar oväder (Looking for a Storm) 3:00
 Nu finns det bevis (Now There's Evidence) 0:45
 Ja, ja, ja, nej (Yes, Yes, Yes, No) 5:09
 I hamnens öga (In the Eye of the Harbour) 4:35

References

2011 albums
Bob Hund albums